Nakshathrangale Kaaval is a 1978 Indian Malayalam-language film adaptation of the Kerala Sahitya Akademi Award-winning novel of the same name by P. Padmarajan. It is directed by K. S. Sethumadhavan and produced by Hari Pothan and stars Jayabharathi, M. G. Soman, Sukumari and Adoor Bhasi in the lead roles. The film has musical score by G. Devarajan.

Cast 

Jayabharathi
M. G. Soman
Sukumari
Adoor Bhasi
Kottayam Santha
Shubha
Bahadoor
KPAC Sunny
Nanditha Bose
T. P. Madhavan
Urmila

Soundtrack 
The music was composed by G. Devarajan and the lyrics were written by O. N. V. Kurup.

References

External links 
 

1978 films
1970s Malayalam-language films
Films directed by K. S. Sethumadhavan
Films based on Indian novels